The Vero Beach Diesel Power Plant (also known as the City of Vero Beach Municipal Power Plant) is a historic power plant in Vero Beach, Florida. Located at 1133 19th Place, the Vero Beach Diesel Power Plant was built in 1926 replacing an earlier power plant due to the areas extensive growth. It was built in the masonry vernacular style by architects Carter and Damerow and by the engineering firm of Kennard and Sons. The structure was the city's first public utilitarian facility. It is also the city's oldest municipal building. On February 26, 1999, it was added to the U.S. National Register of Historic Places.  In June 2016, the Diesel Plant was sold to real estate developer Michael R. Rechter.  Following a $6 million renovation, the building and property were adapted and reutilized as American Icon Brewery - a brewpub/production brewery which opened in September 2017.

References

External links

 Indian River County listings at National Register of Historic Places
 Indian River County listings at Florida's Office of Cultural and Historical Programs

National Register of Historic Places in Indian River County, Florida
Buildings and structures in Vero Beach, Florida
1926 establishments in Florida
Energy infrastructure completed in 1926